The 2016 Women’s Euro Beach Soccer Cup was the inaugural edition of the international, European beach soccer championship for women's national teams. Having promoted women's friendlies and exhibition events since 2009, and hosting a men's version of the Euro Beach Soccer Cup since 1998, this was the first official competitive international tournament between Women's national squads to be organised by Beach Soccer Worldwide (BSWW).

Six nations took part in a three day competition hosted in Cascais, Portugal, between 29 and 31 July, alongside the men's 2016 Mundialito tournament.

The tournament was won by Spain.

Teams

Group stage
The draw took place on 1 July 2016 at BSWW's headquarters in Barcelona.

Group A

Group B

Classification matches

Fifth place play-off

Third place play-off

Final

Awards
After the final, the following awards were presented.

Winners' trophy

Individual awards

Goalscorers
Note that one Dutch goal is missing

6 goals
 Molly Clark

4 goals
 Marianne Van der Schoor

3 goals
 Carolina Gonzalez
 Konstantina Mylona
 Adrienne Krysl
 Jade Widdowson
 Lucy Quinn
 Mélissa Gomes
 Ana Patricia Silva

2 goals
 Marianne ten Brinke
 Regina Pereira
 Lorena Asensio

 Andrea Miron
 Sandra Genovesi
 Carmen Imhasly
 Vanessa Meyer
 Sandra Maurer
 Carla Silva

1 goal
 Grytsje Van den Berg
 Jennieke De Pater
 Sara Brasil
 Sara González
 Dimitra Kossova
 Efstathia Tsimpoukaki 
 Franziska Steinemann
 Susanne Stutz
 Leeta Rutherford
 Gemma Hillier

 Eirini Nikolaou
 Eveline Zech
 Joelle De Bondt 
 Stef Saaltink
 Sarah Kempson
 Claudia Pereira
 Selene Alegre

Own goals
 Aafke De Hoek (vs. Portugal)

Final standings

References

Women
2016 in beach soccer
2016 in Portuguese sport
International association football competitions hosted by Portugal
July 2016 sports events in Europe